Rex L. Mirich (born March 11, 1941) is a former American football defensive lineman in the American Football League (AFL) and the National Football League (NFL). After playing college football for Northern Arizona, Mirich was drafted by both the AFL and the NFL in 1963. He was selected by the Minnesota Vikings in the 16th round (212th overall) of the 1963 NFL Draft and by the Oakland Raiders in the 20th round (153rd overall) of the 1963 AFL Draft. He played seven seasons for the AFL's Oakland Raiders (1964–1966) and Denver Broncos (1967–1969), and the NFL's Boston Patriots (1970).

In 2012, he was inducted into the College Football Hall of Fame.

References

1941 births
Living people
People from Florence, Arizona
Sportspeople from the Phoenix metropolitan area
Players of American football from Arizona
American football defensive linemen
Northern Arizona Lumberjacks football players
College Football Hall of Fame inductees
Oakland Raiders players
Denver Broncos (AFL) players
Boston Patriots players
American Football League players